Clem Currie (21 October 1880 –  12 October 1937) was a Cape Colony international rugby union player who played as a forward.

He made 1 appearance for Cape Colony in 1903.

References

Rugby union players from Cape Colony
1880 births
1937 deaths
Rugby union forwards
Griquas (rugby union) players